Nebra (official name: Nebra (Unstrut)) is a town in the district of Burgenlandkreis of Saxony-Anhalt, Germany. It is situated on the river Unstrut. Nebra has become nationally and internationally known as the site where the Nebra sky disc, a notable Bronze Age artifact, was discovered. The town has a population of around 3,300.

Geography

Location
Nebra lies between Querfurt and Naumburg on the Unstrut river in the west of Burgenlandkreis district.

Subdivisions

Neighboring communities
Neighboring towns are Querfurt, Barnstädt and Steigra (all three in Saalekreis) to the north, Karsdorf to the east, Bad Bibra to the south and Kaiserpfalz to the west.

History

In 1962, four Magdalenian figurines were found near Nebra from the late Upper Paleolithic, which belong to the oldest known artwork in  Saxony-Anhalt. The figures are 12,000 to 14,000 years old.

The town is perhaps most famous due to the Nebra sky disk, which was found in Wangen near Nebra in 1999. It only became public in 2002 when the finders tried to sell it and were eventually arrested following a sting operation in Basel, Switzerland. The sky disc is thought to have been created between 2100 and 1700 BCE and to have been buried in approximately 1600 BCE.

The oldest historical documents mentioning Nebra date back to 876. Town privileges were acquired in the 12th century.

Nebra Castle was built in 1540 by the von Nißmitz brothers.

For many centuries, red sandstone was mined in the region which was used for castles and farmhouses.

Between 1952 and 1994, Nebra was the seat of the Nebra municipality in Halle district.

The name of the town was changed on 1 January 1998, from Nebra to Nebra (Unstrut).

On 1 July 2009  the previously separate village of Wangen was merged with Nebra, and on 1 September 2010 the village Reinsdorf was annexed.

Nebra today features the Courths-Mahler archives and Arche Nebra, a museum on the history of the Nebra sky disk. The sky disc itself is exhibited at the Halle State Museum of Prehistory.

Notable people

 Gallus Dreßler (1533–around 1585), cantor and composer
 Michael Ranft (1700–1774), was the diaconate to Nebra 1727–1740. 
 Hedwig Courths-Mahler (1867–1950), bestseller author
 Dieter Lindner (racewalker) (born 1937), racewalker
 Georg Christoph Biller (1955–2022), chorus conductor and Thomaskantor

References

External links 

Archaeological sites in Germany
Burgenlandkreis